Cambridge Display Technology (CDT) is a technology company with head office in Godmanchester, England. It was the first company spun out of the University of Cambridge ever to go public. It was subsequently acquired by Sumitomo Chemical for about $285 million in 2007.

History 
Cambridge Display Technology was founded in 1992 in order to commercialise technologies made possible by the discovery of a new form of electroluminescence made in 1989 by Cavendish Laboratory researchers Richard Friend, Donal Bradley, and Jeremy Burroughes and Department of Chemistry researchers Chloe Jennings and Andrew Holmes.

In 2002, the company was awarded the MacRobert Award by the Royal Academy of Engineering for organic LED displays.

CDT's initial public offering (IPO) took place on the NASDAQ stock exchange in December 2004.

In 2007, the company became a subsidiary of Sumitomo Chemical.

References 

Technology companies established in 1992
British companies established in 1992
Companies based in Cambridgeshire
2004 initial public offerings